Marjorie Mayans (born 17 November 1990) is a French rugby union player. She represented  at the 2014 Women's Rugby World Cup. She was a member of the squad that won their fourth Six Nations title in 2014. Mayans was also part of the French sevens team at the 2013 Rugby World Cup Sevens.

Mayans was selected as a member of the France women's national rugby sevens team to the 2016 Summer Olympics. She is studying at the Toulouse 1 Capitole University.

Mayans was named in France's fifteens team for the 2021 Rugby World Cup in New Zealand.

References

External links
 
 

1990 births
Living people
French female rugby union players
Female rugby sevens players
Rugby sevens players at the 2016 Summer Olympics
Olympic rugby sevens players of France
France international rugby sevens players
France international women's rugby sevens players